Rubizhne is a city located in Luhansk Oblast in eastern Ukraine. Situated on the left bank of the Donets river near the cities of Sievierodonetsk and Lysychansk, Rubizhne was founded in 1895 and incorporated as a city in 1934.

In 2014, Rubizhne at the start of the war in Donbas, Rubizhne was contested between Ukrainian and pro-Russian separatist forces. From mid-2014 until early 2022 the city was under control of the Ukrainian armed forces. From early 2022 it has been under the de facto control of Russia as a result of the Battle of Rubizhne. The population of Rubizhne in 2022 was  Prior to 2020, it was a city of oblast significance.

History 
The city started growing from a railway station built in 1904. A local newspaper is published in the city since March 1931.

During World War II, in 1942–1943, the German occupiers operated a Nazi prison in the town.

At the outbreak of the war in Donbas in mid-April 2014, pro-Russian forces captured several towns in Luhansk Oblast, including Rubizhne. On 21 July 2014, Ukrainian forces secured the city from the militants.

2022 Russian invasion 

During the 2022 Russian invasion of Ukraine, within the Eastern Ukraine offensive, Rubizhne came under heavy shelling from the Russian military. Some of the most intense strikes occurred late in March 2022, which destroyed dozens of buildings and caused civilian casualties. An attack on a nitric acid facility in Rubizhne was reported on 9 April 2022.

During the Battle of Donbas, on 21 April, Russia reportedly captured the city; Ukraine denied that. Ramzan Kadyrov, the president of Chechnya, said that Russia had "liberated" the city on 25 April.

On 12 May, it was reported that Ukrainian forces had fully retreated from the settlement to take up new defensive positions near Sievierodonetsk and had destroyed a bridge in order to slow the Russian advance.

Demographics
Rubizhne had 65,322 inhabitants in the Ukrainian Census of 2001. The city's population declined to 59,951 by January 1, 2014.

The ethnic composition according to the Ukrainian Census of 2001:

Ukrainians: 66.3%
Russians: 31.3%
Belarusians: 0.7%
Jews: 0.07%
Poles: 0.06

Economy
Prior to the 2022 war, Rubizhne was known for its chemical and pharmaceutical plants and factories. The headquarters of "Microkhim", the largest Ukrainian producer of substances and medicines for cardiology, was situated in Rubizhne. One of Ukraine's biggest plastic pipe plants, is also located in the town.

Notable residents
Rubizhne is the town of birth of MMA Heavyweight Champion Fedor Emelianenko, and Olympic champion in fencing Vladimir Smirnov.

References

External links
 Official site of Rubizhne city council

Destroyed cities
Cities in Luhansk Oblast
Sievierodonetsk Raion
Yekaterinoslav Governorate
Donets
Populated places established in the Russian Empire